The Viștea is a left tributary of the river Olt in Romania. It discharges into the Olt in Viștea de Jos. Its source is in the Făgăraș Mountains.

References

Rivers of Romania
Rivers of Brașov County